What A Moonlit Night is a Ukrainian song composed by kobzar Andriy Voloshchenko and Vasyl Ovchynnikov with lyrics from a poem by Mykhailo Starytsky. 

Mykola Lysenko wrote the music for it, as an aria included in the opera, based on Mykola Gogol's story "The Drowned". It was first published in 1885 in the Odesa almanac "Niva". However, the song became world-famous with a different melody, which was composed by the Andriy Voloshchenko and Vasyl Ovchinnikov.

One of Ukraine's most popular folk songs, it has been performed by Oleksandr Ponomariov, Konstantin Ognevoy, Anatoliy Solovianenko, Dmytro Hnatyuk, Mykola Kondratiuk, Cara Schlecker, Mykola Platonov, Evgeny Belyaev, Boris Gmyrya, Kvitka Cisyk, Yaroslav Alexandrovich Evdokimov, Christian Ketter, and Alexander Malinin.

Ukrainian text by Mykhailo Starytsky
ВИКЛИК (CALLING)

1870

Ніч яка, Господи! Місячна, зоряна: 

Ясно, хоч голки збирай… 

Вийди, коханая, працею зморена, 

Хоч на хвилиночку в гай!

Сядем укупі ми тут під калиною —

І над панами я пан…

Глянь, моя рибонько, — срібною хвилею

Стелеться полем туман;

Гай чарівний, ніби променем всипаний,

Чи загадався, чи спить?

Он на стрункій та високій осичині

Листя пестливо тремтить;

Небо незміряне всипано зорями —

Що то за Божа краса!

Перлами-зорями теж під тополями

Грає перлиста роса.

Ти не лякайся-но, що свої ніженьки

Вмочиш в холодну росу:

Я тебе, вірная, аж до хатиноньки

Сам на руках однесу.

Ти не лякайсь, а що змерзнеш, лебедонько:

Тепло — ні вітру, ні хмар…

Я пригорну тебе до свого серденька,

Й займеться зразу, мов жар;

Ти не лякайсь, аби тут та підслухали

Тиху розмову твою:

Нічка поклала всіх, соном окутала —

Ані шелесне в гаю!

Сплять вороги твої, знуджені працею,

Нас не сполоха їх сміх…

Чи ж нам, окривдженим долею клятою,

Й хвиля кохання — за гріх?

In the film Only "Old Men" Are Going Into Battle:

Ніч яка місячна, зоряна, ясная. Видно, хоч голки збирай.
Вийди, коханая, працею зморена, хоч на хвилиночку в гай.

Сядемо вкупочці тут під калиною і над панами я пан!
Глянь, моя рибонько, срібною хвилею стелеться полем туман.

Гай чарівний, ніби променем всипаний, чи загадався, чи спить?
Он на стрункій та високій осичині листя пестливо тремтить;

Небо незміряне, всипане зорями, що то за Божа краса!
Перлами ясними, ген під тополями грає краплиста роса.

Ти не лякайся-но, що свої ніженьки вмочиш в холодну росу:
Я тебе, вірная, аж до хатиноньки сам на руках однесу.

Ти не лякайся, що змерзнеш лебідонько. Тепло — ні вітру, ні хмар.
Я пригорну тебе до свого серденька, а воно палке, як жар.

Ти не лякайся, що можуть підслухати, тиху розмову твою.
Нічка поклала всіх, соном окутала, ані шелесне в гаю.

Сплять вороги твої, знуджені працею, нас не сполоха їх сміх.
Чи ж нам, окраденим долею нашею, й хвиля кохання за гріх.

References

Ukrainian folk songs
Year of song unknown